Karl Victor Ryssel, also Carl Victor Ryssel (18 December 1849 – 1 March 1905) was a Protestant theologian and professor in Leipzig and Zürich.

Life 
Ryssel was born in Reinsberg, Germany, near the town of Nossen. From 1861 to 1868 he went to the Gymnasium in Freiberg. From 1867 to 1871 he studied theology and oriental studies at the University of Leipzig. Subsequently, he became a teacher in Leipzig (lecturer, 1878–85; associate professor 1885–89). In 1874 he married Clara Friederici, and they had a daughter Else.

In 1889 he went to the University of Zurich. There he was professor of Old Testament studies and oriental languages (1889–1905).

In 1880–81 he published Über den textkritischen Wert der syrischen Übersetzungen griechischer Klassiker ("On the text-critical value of the Syriac translations of Greek classics").

References

1849 births
1905 deaths
19th-century German theologians
People from Mittelsachsen
Leipzig University alumni
Academic staff of the University of Zurich
Academic staff of Leipzig University